The election to the Berlin House of Representatives occurred on March 2, 1975. The election campaign was marked by the kidnapping of the CDU top candidate, Peter Lorenz. Lorenz was kidnapped three days before the election by 2 June Movement who demanded the release of six of their comrades. This left incumbent SPD mayor Klaus Schütz in the somewhat awkward position of having to determine, so to speak, the life of his challenger. After the federal government gave in to the demands by the 2 June Movement, Peter Lorenz was released two days after the election.

In the election the SPD lost 7.8 percentage points in the election, and with 42.6% of the vote lost its absolute majority that it had held since 1954. The election results gave the power of determining the governing coalition to the FDP. After negotiations, incumbent SPD mayor Klaus Schütz was able to be re-elected at the head of an SPD-FDP government.

|-style="background:#E9E9E9;"
! colspan="2" style="text-align:left;" |Parties
!Votes
!%
!+/-
!Seats
!+/-
|-
| style="background-color: " |
| style="text-align:left;" | Christian Democratic Union
| 604,007	
| 43.9%
| +5.7%
| 69
| +15
|-
| width=5px style="background-color: " |
| style="text-align:left;" | Social Democratic Party of Germany
| 585,605
| 42.6%
| -7.8%
| 67
| -6
|-
| style="background-color: " |
| style="text-align:left;" | Free Democratic Party
| 97,969
| 7.1%
| -1.3%
| 11
| -
|-
| style="background-color: " |
| style="text-align:left;" | Confederation of Free Germany
| 46,691
| 3.4%
| +3.4%
| 0
| 
|-
| style="background-color: " |
| style="text-align:left;" | Socialist Unity Party of West Berlin
| 25,105
| 1.8%
| -0.5%
| 0
| 
|-
|  |
| style="text-align:left;" | Communist Party of Germany
| 10,125
| 0.7%
| +0.7%
| 0
| 
|-
| style="background-color: " |
| style="text-align:left;" | Other Parties
| 6,020
| 0.5%
| -0.1%
| 0
| 
|- style="background:#E9E9E9;"
! colspan="2" style="text-align:left;" |Total
! style="text-align:center;" | 1,387,471
! style="text-align:center;" colspan="2"| 100%
! style="text-align:center;" | 147
! style="text-align:center;" | +10
|-
|colspan=7|Source
|}

State election, 1975
1975 elections in Germany